Burra Creek may refer to:

 Burra Creek (Gundagai), New South Wales
 Burra Creek (Palerang), New South Wales
 Burra Creek (South Australia)